Ko Kradan (Alternately transliterated as Koh Kradan, Ko Kadan or Koh Kadan) is an island in Trang province, Southern Thailand. Ko Kradan is described by Tourism Thailand as one of the most beautiful islands in Trang. Ko Kradan</ref> has white sandy beaches and transparent water which allow the coral reef to be seen clearly. Most of Ko Kradan is controlled by Hat Chao Mai National Park. The rest is privately owned.

Geography 
Ko Kradan is named from its oblong shape. Ko Kradan has an area approximately 600 acres or 2.4 square kilometers. It is located about 10 kilometers from the southeast coast of Thailand.

Beach division
•Ko Kradan Beach is located on the east of the island. The beach is about 2 kilometers long. From the beach, you can see Ko Libong, Ko Whan, Ko Mook, and Ko Cherg.

•Ao Niang Beach is located on the south of the island. The beach is about 800 meters lon.. From the beach, you can see Ko Libong.

•Ao Pai Beach is located on the north of the island. The beach is about 200 meters long but has no coral reef.  From the beach, you can see Ko Cherg, Ko Whan, and Ko Mook.

•Ao Chong Lom Beach is located on the west of the island. The beach is about 800 meters long, and is called "Sunset Beach" for its exceptional  sunset.

References

External links

Tourist attractions in Trang province
Islands of Thailand
Geography of Trang province